Katrin Böhning-Gaese (born 22 December 1964) is a German biologist who specialises in ornithology. She is currently a professor at Goethe University Frankfurt, director of the Senckenberg Nature Research Society and Vice-President of the Leibniz Association.

Biography 
Katrin Böhning-Gaese was born on 22 December 1964 in Oberkochen, Germany. She initially studied biology as an undergraduate at the University of Tübingen. She gained her PhD in 1993 from the same University on following research into of white stork food ecology in Upper Swabia and causes of long-term stock development in European and North American songbirds. She held the title of Professor of ecology at the Johannes Gutenberg University Mainz in 2001.

Her main research interests include the influence of global climate change and human land use change on animal populations in tropical and temperate areas of the world and evolution of bird communities and bird migration. In addition to research work she also teaches students in the MSc Ecology and Evolution and BSc Biology courses at Goethe University Frankfurt since 2010.

Other activities
 German Council for Sustainable Development (RNE), Member (since 2023, appointed ad personam by Chancellor Olaf Scholz)
 Leibniz Association, Vice-President (since 2017)
 Senckenberg Nature Museum, Member of the Governing Board

Awards
 2021 German Environmental Prize

Selected publications

References 

1964 births
Living people
People from Ostalbkreis
University of Tübingen alumni
Academic staff of Johannes Gutenberg University Mainz
Academic staff of Goethe University Frankfurt
21st-century German biologists
German women biologists
German ornithologists
Members of the German Academy of Sciences Leopoldina